Khalil-ur-Rehman Dummar is a Pakistani politician who was a Member of the Provincial Assembly of Balochistan, from May 2013 to May 2018.

Early life 
He was born on 3 June 1988 to Gul Muhammad Dummar.

Political career

He was elected to the Provincial Assembly of Balochistan as a candidate of Jamiat Ulema-e Islam (F) from Constituency PB-7 Ziarat in by-election held in March 2017. He received 13,774  votes and defeated a candidate of Pakistan Tehreek-e-Insaf.

References

Living people
Balochistan MPAs 2013–2018
1988 births
Jamiat Ulema-e-Islam (F) politicians